American Samoa competed at the 2014 Summer Youth Olympics in Nanjing, China from 16 August to 28 August 2014.

Athletics

American Samoa qualified one athlete.

Qualification Legend: Q=Final A (medal); qB=Final B (non-medal); qC=Final C (non-medal); qD=Final D (non-medal); qE=Final E (non-medal)

Boys
Track & road events

Wrestling

American Samoa qualified four athletes based on its performance at the 2014 Oceania Cadet Championships.

Boys

References

2014 in American Samoan sports
Nations at the 2014 Summer Youth Olympics
American Samoa at the Youth Olympics